Ascot Park was an electoral district of the House of Assembly in the Australian state of South Australia from 1970 to 1985. It was preceded by the seat of Edwardstown and replaced by the seat of Walsh.

At the 2018 state election, the suburb of Ascot Park was located in the Labor seat of Badcoe.

Members

Election results

References 

Former electoral districts of South Australia
1970 establishments in Australia
1985 disestablishments in Australia
Constituencies established in 1970
Constituencies disestablished in 1985